is a Japanese football player.

Career
Hiroyuki Sugimoto or "Sugi" started football career in Japan. He played for FC Gifu. He then continued his career in Thailand after departing FC Gifu. His first Thai club was TTM Customs, a Yamaha League 1 football club (second-tier league). In early 2016, He joined Chamchuri United, a team in AIS League Division 2 club (third-tier league). In the name of Pink Power, he played his first game against Army United. His debut was tremendous with a winning goal to the team.

At the end of 2017, he has played 45 games and scored 20 goals with 13 assists for the team, crowned with one of leading goal scorers for Chamchuri United. In season 2017, he was a club top goal scorer by 13 goals. In season 2018, he was used as a wide targetman or inside forward which he contributed both supporting and defensive roles to the team. He scored 6 goals and provided 1 assist in 2018. During his career with Chamchuri United, he has shown his skill as a shadow striker and deep-lying forward who helps linking between midfield and forward.

From season 2015 to 2018, Sugi has played 71 games, scored 26 goals and provided 14 assists for Chamchuri United.

Hiroyuki Sugimoto is regarded as a player favorite and fan favorite person. He is welcome by all parties including staffs, team players and supporters. He is also considered as a sporting player in his professional career.

Club statistics

Honours

Clubs
Chamchuri United
 Regional League Bangkok Area Division (1): 2016

References

External links

j-league
Thai League T3 Official Site : http://www.thaileague.co.th/official/t3/?r=Clubs/ClubData&id=121&tabs=11
Chamchuri United Supporters Page : www.facebook.com/ChamUSupporters

1986 births
Living people
Meiji University alumni
Association football people from Saitama Prefecture
Japanese footballers
J2 League players
Thespakusatsu Gunma players
FC Gifu players
Association football forwards
Hiroyuki Sugimoto